Yang Tung-yi born December 20, 1978, was a Taiwanese baseball player who played for the Uni-President Lions of the Chinese Professional Baseball League. He played as shortstop for the Lions.

See also
Chinese Professional Baseball League
Uni-President Lions

References

1978 births
Living people
Taiwanese baseball players
Uni-President 7-Eleven Lions players
People from Taitung County